Gundewar is an Indian surname. Notable people with the surname include:

Sai Gundewar (born Saiprasad Gundewar, 1978–2020), Indian actor, model, voiceover artist, and entrepreneur
Vilasrao Gundewar, Indian politician

Indian surnames